Nebovirus is a genus of viruses, in the family Caliciviridae. Bovine serve as natural hosts. There is only one species in this genus: Newbury 1 virus. Diseases associated with this genus include: Gastroenteritis.

Structure
Viruses in Nebovirus are non-enveloped, with icosahedral geometries, and T=3, T=1 symmetry. The diameter is around 35 nm. Genomes are linear and non-segmented, around 8.3kb in length.

Life cycle
Viral replication is cytoplasmic. Entry into the host cell is achieved by attachment to host receptors, which mediates endocytosis. Replication follows the positive stranded RNA virus replication model. Positive stranded RNA virus transcription is the method of transcription. Translation takes place by RNA termination-reinitiation. Bovine serve as the natural host.

References

External links
 ICTV Report: Caliciviridae
 Viralzone: Nebovirus

Caliciviridae
Virus genera